The 2018 Cherwell District Council election was held on 3 May 2018 to elect members of Cherwell District Council in England. This was on the same day as other local elections.

Elections were held for 16 of the seats on the council. The Conservative Party won one seat from an independent councillor. Labour Party and the Liberal Democrats each won one seat from the Conservatives. The Conservative Party remained in overall control of the council, with its majority reduced to 29. The Labour Party remained the largest opposition group, with their seats increased to nine. The Liberal Democrats became the third party with one seat.

Ward results

Adderbury, Bloxham and Bodicote

Banbury Calthorpe and Easington

Banbury Cross and Neithrop

Banbury Grimsbury and Hightown

Banbury Hardwick

Banbury Ruscote

Bicester East

Bicester North and Caversfield

Bicester South and Ambrosden

Cropredy, Sibfords and Wroxton

Deddington

Fringford and the Heyfords

Kidlington East

Kidlington West

Launton and Otmoor

References

2010s in Oxfordshire
2018
2018 English local elections